Pipat Ratchakitprakarn (born 5 August 1955) is a Thai politician.  he serves as Minister of Tourism and Sports in the second cabinet of Prime Minister Prayut Chan-o-cha.

References 

Living people
1955 births
Place of birth missing (living people)
Pipat Ratchakitprakarn
Pipat Ratchakitprakarn
Pipat Ratchakitprakarn